In chemistry, an alkoxide is the conjugate base of an alcohol and therefore consists of an organic group bonded to a negatively charged oxygen atom. Alkoxides are strong bases and, when R is not bulky, good nucleophiles and good ligands. Alkoxides, although generally not stable in protic solvents such as water, occur widely as intermediates in various reactions, including the Williamson ether synthesis. Transition metal alkoxides are widely used for coatings and as catalysts.

Enolates are unsaturated alkoxides derived by deprotonation of a  bond adjacent to a ketone or aldehyde.  The nucleophilic center for simple alkoxides is located on the oxygen, whereas the nucleophilic site on enolates is delocalized onto both carbon and oxygen sites. Ynolates are also unsaturated alkoxides derived from acetylenic alcohols.

Phenoxides are close relatives of the alkoxides, in which the alkyl group is replaced by a derivative of benzene.  Phenol is more acidic than a typical alcohol; thus, phenoxides are correspondingly less basic and less nucleophilic than alkoxides.  They are, however, often easier to handle, and yield derivatives that are more crystalline than those of the alkoxides.

Structure
Alkali metal alkoxides are often oligomeric or polymeric compounds, especially when the R group is small (Me, Et).  The alkoxide anion is a good bridging ligand, thus many alkoxides feature  or  linkages.  In solution, the alkali metal derivatives exhibit strong ion-pairing, as expected for the alkali metal derivative of a strongly basic anion.

Preparation

From reducing metals
Alkoxides can be produced by several routes starting from an alcohol.  Highly reducing metals react directly with alcohols to give the corresponding metal alkoxide.  The alcohol serves as an acid, and hydrogen is produced as a by-product.  A classic case is sodium methoxide produced by the addition of sodium metal to methanol:

2 CH3OH + 2Na -> 2CH3ONa + H2

Other alkali metals can be used in place of sodium, and most alcohols can be used in place of methanol. Another similar reaction occurs when an alcohol is reacted with a metal hydride such as NaH. The metal hydride removes the hydrogen atom from the hydroxyl group and forms a negatively charged alkoxide ion.

Properties

Reactions with alkyl halides
The alkoxide ion and its salts react with primary alkyl halides  in an SN2 reaction to form an ether via the Williamson Ether Synthesis.

Hydrolysis and transesterification
Aliphatic metal alkoxides decompose in water as summarized in this idealized equation:

In the transesterification process, metal alkoxides react with esters to bring about an exchange of alkyl groups between metal alkoxide and ester. With the metal alkoxide complex in focus, the result is the same as for alcoholysis, namely the replacement of alkoxide ligands, but at the same time the alkyl groups of the ester are changed, which can also be the primary goal of the reaction. Sodium methoxide, for example, is commonly used for this purpose, a reaction that is used in the production of biodiesel.

Formation of oxo-alkoxides
Many metal alkoxide compounds also feature oxo-ligands. Oxo-ligands typically arise via the hydrolysis, often accidentally, and via ether elimination:

Thermal stability
Many metal alkoxides thermally decompose in the range ~100–300 °C. Depending on process conditions, this thermolysis can afford nanosized powders of oxide or metallic phases. This approach is a basis of processes of fabrication of functional materials intended for aircraft, space, electronic fields, and chemical industry: individual oxides, their solid solutions, complex oxides, powders of metals and alloys active towards sintering.  Decomposition of mixtures of mono- and heterometallic alkoxide derivatives has also been examined. This method represents a prospective approach possessing an advantage of capability of obtaining functional materials with increased phase and chemical homogeneity and controllable grain size (including the preparation of nanosized materials) at relatively low temperature (less than 500−900 °C) as compared with the conventional techniques.

Illustrative alkoxides

Further reading

References

Functional groups
 
Coordination chemistry